U/A may refer to:
 U/A certificate, a censor rating given by the Central Board of Film Certification of India
 Urinalysis
 U/A (album), a 2008 album by Chandrabindoo